Julio Alberto Mañón [mah'-nion] (born June 10, 1973 in San Antonio de Guerra, Dominican Republic) is a Dominican former professional baseball relief pitcher.

Career

Starting from the Dominican 
Mañón was originally signed as an undrafted free agent by the St. Louis Cardinals in 1993. He did not make his debut until 2003 with the Montreal Expos. He went 1–2 with a 4.13 ERA in 23 games.

Asian baseball 
After the 2003 season, his contract was sold to the Kia Tigers of the Korean Baseball League. He spent the 2005 season in Taiwan, with the Uni-President Lions of the Chinese Professional Baseball League.

Back in MLB 
Mañón came back to baseball in the United States in 2006, when he signed a minor league contract with the Baltimore Orioles on March 6. He would later go on to go 0–1 with a 5.40 ERA in 22 games for the Orioles and played in the Triple A All-star game whilst playing for the Ottawa Lynx. He then was granted free agency after the 2006 season on November 19. On June 5, 2007, he signed a minor league contract with the Cincinnati Reds. After that, he was traded to the Athletics on July 13 to complete an earlier deal that had sent pitchers Kirk Saarloos and Dan Denham to the Reds and pitcher David Shafer to the Athletics. He spent the most of the 2008 season playing in the Orioles organization for the Double-A Bowie Baysox.

Independent & Mexican Leagues 
On September 12, 2008, Mañón signed with the Long Island Ducks of the Atlantic League. He pitched the rest of 2008 for the Ducks. He played in 2009 World Baseball Classic representing his native country Dominican Republic who were upset by the Netherlands in the March Classic. In 2009, he continued to play for the Ducks. In 2010, he played Sultanes de Monterrey of the Mexican League and the York Revolution of the Atlantic League. In 2011, his final season, he played for the Bridgeport Bluefish of the Atlantic League and the Vaqueros Laguna of the Mexican League.

References

External links

Julio Mañón at Pura Pelota (Venezuelan Professional Baseball League)

1973 births
Living people
Arizona League Cardinals players
Azucareros del Este players
Baltimore Orioles players
Bowie Baysox players
Bridgeport Bluefish players
Charleston RiverDogs players
Dominican Republic expatriate baseball players in Canada
Dominican Republic expatriate baseball players in Mexico
Dominican Republic expatriate baseball players in South Korea
Dominican Republic expatriate baseball players in Taiwan
Dominican Republic expatriate baseball players in the United States
Edmonton Trappers players
Gulf Coast Expos players
Harrisburg Senators players
Johnson City Cardinals players
KBO League pitchers
Kia Tigers players

Leones del Escogido players
Long Island Ducks players
Louisville Bats players
Major League Baseball pitchers
Major League Baseball players from the Dominican Republic
Mexican League baseball pitchers
Montreal Expos players
Orlando Rays players
Ottawa Lynx players
Pastora de los Llanos players
People from San Antonio de Guerra
River City Rumblers players
Sacramento River Cats players
Sarasota Reds players
St. Paul Saints players
St. Petersburg Devil Rays players
Sultanes de Monterrey players
Toros del Este players
Uni-President Lions players
Vaqueros Laguna players
World Baseball Classic players of the Dominican Republic
York Revolution players
2009 World Baseball Classic players
Dominican Republic expatriate baseball players in Venezuela